John Elliott Williams (June 30, 1927 – February 26, 2005) was an American football defensive back and kick returner in the National Football League for the Washington Redskins and San Francisco 49ers.  He played college football at the University of Southern California and was drafted in the 26th round of the 1951 NFL Draft.

External links
 
 

1927 births
2005 deaths
American football return specialists
American football defensive backs
Eastern Conference Pro Bowl players
Players of American football from Los Angeles
San Francisco 49ers players
USC Trojans football players
Washington Redskins players